Sludge Life is an indie first-person video game oriented toward graffiti. The game was designed by musician Adam "Doseone" Drucker and artist Terri Vellmann following their release of High Hell on Devolver Digital. Sludge Life was released in 2020 for free for the first year. It has been released along with a soundtrack EP and digital album.

Gameplay
Sludge Life is an open-world adventure game based on graffiti, parkour, and urban culture. Initially equipped with nothing more than a spray can and laptop, the player must leap and climb to find prime locations for tagging in order to further explore the environment. Tagging (especially difficult tags) enables the player to gain respect from other taggers and eventually allows the player to co-operate with a series of murals. Interactions with other taggers allow the player to open areas and to pick up new items including a camera, glider, warper, and "vandal eyes". The laptop can also be updated with 7 apps (music, video, a minigame, etc.), and the player can play basketball, smoke cigarettes, and zoom (the term for using psychedelic mushrooms). There are 100 tags to spray and there are three possible endings.

Plot
Sludge Life is based on the efforts of a graffitist to be recognized by his peers. Set in a fictional 1990's-era oil rig/shipyard, the main character, Ghost, spends time meeting inhabitants, exploring, and spray-painting tags and murals. As Ghost gains in fame and respect, new areas are opened and more of the Glug corporate structure is exposed. Ghost learns about a strike against Glug protesting the death of the corporate mascot, Ciggy. Although there is no specific requirement or order, Ghost can find numerous adventures. While climbing and exploring the rig, its environs, and the buildings on it, Ghost is able to find three possible endings.

Development
Sludge Life was developed by Adam Drucker AKA Doseone and Terri Vellmann from Devolver Digital. Previewed at 2020's PAX East (29 Feb - 1 Mar), the game demonstrated an emphasis on graffiti, music, resistance, grime, and crass humor. Notably, however, the game was dramatically less violent than the developer's previous High Hell (and later Disc Room). In fact Vellmann's first conception of Sludge Life would be to remove guns entirely. Focusing on NPCs rather than enemies, Drucker and Vellmann began to develop personalities in the new game. Characters were designed based on real people with Drucker describing "a guy who used to always talk with him at the gym". As ludic aspects developed, Drucker drew from activities of his youth including running, climbing, and street art. To emphasize the visual aspects of graffiti and its spatial relationship vis-à-vis the observer, parkour became a primary theme.

Music and visuals also began to be emphasized. In adopting psychedelic and vaporwave elements, Vellmann developed an aesthetic style including Ghost's laptop, hallucinogenic "zoom" trips, and the smoggy backgrounds. Drucker developed the music along with Big Mud and DJ Dead, and a 45rpm EP was released within the laptop as well as in reality on Bandcamp. Sludge Life was released by EpicGames on 28 May 2020 and was offered for free for the first year. The Switch and Stream versions were released as soon as the EpicGames version was sold on 2 June 2021. A physical version was planned for Switch.

Reception

After its initial 2020 release as a free game with EpicGames, numerous reviewers encouraged players to test Sludge Life. The second release (allowing Switch and Steam) in 2021, provided additional reviews to examine the game again. Recognized for its laissez-faire exploration which the developers described as a "Walking simulator", early reviews emphasized the humor in the game as well as its strange mood/atmosphere. The game was compared to 2000's Jet Set Radio in its themes, but otherwise more similar to visual media like the programming from Adult Swim or Liquid Television from the mid-1990s.

From the initial 2020 release from EpicGames, reviewers emphasized the game as having a niche and unique/eccentric vibe. The 1-year free price was also broadly appreciated, and the game was praised for its gameplay and the music. Criticism was primarily limited to controls which were found to "wonky", however additional criticisms came in the form of its relatively short length and the inelegance of developing its uniqueness. Hardcore Gamer gave the game a score of 4/5.

Reviews of 2021 from Switch, Steam, GOG, etc., were similarly positive with NintendoLife describing the game as "visually striking", "genuine", and "vibrant", Eurogamer describing it as "astonishingly clever", and Nintendo World Report claiming it as "wild and truly unique. There's really nothing like it. Sludge Life is a vibe". Complaints were limited to the visuals and mechanics which NintendoLife found to "feel inconsistent" and to potentially cause "confusion between which objects can be climbed like ladders and which cannot". Nintendo World Report also worried that the non-linearity of the game might be off-putting for gamers. Scores of 8/10 were awarded from both NintendoLife and Nintendo World Report.

Controversy
Sludge Life was banned by the Australian Classification Board after rating the game a "refused classification" (RC) in June 2021. Although details from the Board were scant, the May 2021 review and re-rate of Disco Elysium: The Final Cut (banned in March 2021) suggested that the reason for Disco Elysium may have been for the same reason: "use of drugs". Similar rating boards like the ESRB (USA) has given Sludge Life similar mature rates such as Mature 17+ (M).

See also
Doseone
Devolver Digital
Jet Set Radio
Marc Ecko's Getting Up: Contents Under Pressure
Mirror's Edge

Reference

External Links

Doseone @ bandcamp.com

2020 video games
Devolver Digital games
Dystopian video games
First-person shooters
Graffiti video games
Indie video games
Linux games
MacOS games
Nintendo Switch games
Open-world video games
Parkour video games
Single-player video games
Video games developed in Brazil
Video games developed in the United States
Video games with cel-shaded animation
Windows games